Herqueville may refer to several communes in Normandy, France:

Herqueville, Eure
Herqueville, Manche
Heugueville-sur-Sienne, in the Manche département